Amelia Island State Recreation Area is a state park in Florida, United States.

References and external links
Amelia Island State Recreation Area. Online. January 8, 2006.
Amelia Island State Park at Florida State Parks

Specific

State parks of Florida
Parks in Nassau County, Florida
Parks in Duval County, Florida
Amelia Island